Richard Walker Bolling (May 17, 1916 – April 21, 1991) was a prominent American Democratic Congressman from Kansas City, Missouri, and Missouri's 5th congressional district from 1949 to 1983. He retired after serving for four years as the chairman of the powerful United States House Committee on Rules.

Early life and education
Born in New York City as the great-great-grandson of John Williams Walker and great-great-nephew of Percy Walker, he attended Phillips Exeter Academy, Exeter, New Hampshire. At the age of fifteen, upon his father's death, he returned to the family home in Huntsville, Alabama. He then attended the University of the South, in Sewanee, Tennessee, where he studied literature and French, earning a B.A. in 1937 and an M.A., 1939. He went on to further graduate studies, at Vanderbilt University in Nashville, Tennessee, in 1939–1940.

Academic career
An educational administrator by profession, Bolling taught at Sewanee Military Academy in 1938 and 1939, and then served as assistant to the head of the Department of Education at Florence State Teachers College, in Alabama, in 1940.

After retiring from Congress, Bolling was a visiting professor of political science at the University of Missouri-Kansas City and a professor of politics at Boston College in Massachusetts.

Military career
In April 1941, Bolling entered the United States Army as a private and served until discharged as a lieutenant colonel in July 1946, with four years' overseas service as assistant to the chief of staff to General Douglas MacArthur in Australia, New Guinea, Philippines, and in Japan.  He was awarded the Legion of Merit and Bronze Star. He served as veterans' adviser at the University of Kansas City in 1946 and 1947.

Political career
Bolling was elected as a Democrat to the Eighty-first Congress in 1948 and to the sixteen succeeding Congresses, serving from January 3, 1949 until January 3, 1983. In Congress, he served as chairman of the Select Committee on Committees of the House (in the Ninety-third Congress), Joint Economic Committee (in the Ninety-fifth Congress); and the Committee on Rules (in the Ninety-sixth and Ninety-seventh Congresses). He introduced the discharge petition that released the Civil Rights Act of 1964 from the Senate's committees chaired by southern Democrats, a vital step to passing the act. He was twice a candidate for House Majority leader, losing to Carl Albert in 1961 and to Jim Wright (by three votes) in 1977.

Bolling did not sign the 1956 Southern Manifesto, and voted in favor of the Civil Rights Acts of 1957, 1960, 1964, and 1968, and the Voting Rights Act of 1965, but voted present on the 24th Amendment to the U.S. Constitution.

Due to heart disease, in 1981 he announced his retirement and was not a candidate for reelection in 1982 to the Ninety-eighth Congress. In 1983, Bolling was elected to the Common Cause National Governing Board. He remained a resident of Washington, D.C., until his death there on April 21, 1991.

Personal life
Bolling resided in Washington, D.C., and maintained a summer home at Portage Point, Michigan.  During the 1970s, Congressman Bolling owned a cottage on St. Barthelemy in the French West Indies, which he also rented to other vacationers.

On June 7, 1945, Bolling married Barbara Stratton, the sister of the author and OSS agent Arthur Stratton. They had one daughter, Andrea Walker Bolling.  He subsequently married Jim Grant Akin, a Congressional liaison officer for the U.S. Department of Health Education and Welfare, who later served as his legislative affairs assistant. Following  her death in 1978, psychologist Dr. Prudie Luther Orr and he were married in Memphis, Tenn.  His spouse at the time of his death was Nona Herndon, of Dallas.

Honors
The Richard Bolling Federal Building in Kansas City, Missouri is named in his honor.

References

External links

 
 Transcript of Richard W. Bolling's oral history interview at the John F. Kennedy Presidential Library
 Guide to the Richard W. Bolling Papers at the University of Missouri, Kansas City.
 New York Times'', Obituary, 1991.
 Transcript of Bolling's Oral History at the Harry S. Truman Library.

United States Army personnel of World War II
Politicians from New York City
Sewanee: The University of the South alumni
Phillips Exeter Academy alumni
Vanderbilt University alumni
Recipients of the Legion of Merit
United States Army colonels
1916 births
1991 deaths
Democratic Party members of the United States House of Representatives from Missouri
20th-century American politicians
Walker family